The 2023 Malaysia FA Cup is the 33rd edition of the Malaysia FA Cup, a knockout competition for Malaysian association football clubs. The winners, if eligible, would be assured a place in the 2024–25 AFC Cup group stage.

Johor Darul Ta'zim are the defending champions, having beaten Terengganu in the 2022 final.

Qualified teams
The FA Cup is a knockout competition with 20 teams taking part all trying to reach the Final at Bukit Jalil National Stadium on 22 July 2023 (possibility). The competition consisted of 14 teams from the Super League and 6 teams from M3 League.

For this season, there is no draw for the second round matches for the top 6 clubs of the Super League 2022 and the top 2 clubs of the Premier League who qualify automatically to the next round based on the seeding position based on the league position of the 2022 season.

The following teams played in the competition. Reserve teams were excluded.

Round and draw dates 

The draw for the 2023 Malaysia FA Cup was held on 10 February 2023.

First round
The draw involves the team position for the first round only involving the bottom 3 teams of the Super League season 2022, and also the bottom 3 teams of the Premier League season 2022, along with 6 M3 League teams to find four slots to the second round proper. Based on draw result, the four teams (Kelantan United, Melaka, PIB Shah Alam, PDRM) were given a bye to the second round proper.

Key: (1) = Super League; (3) = M3 League

Second round

Key: (1) = Super League; (3) = M3 League

The top 6 clubs from the 2022 Super League together with the top 2 clubs from the 2022 Premier League, will automatically qualify for the second round proper.

Top scorers

See also 
 2023 Malaysia Super League
 2023 Malaysia M3 League

References

External links
 Football Malaysia LLP website - Piala FA
 Result Reports 

Piala FA seasons
Malaysia
FA Cup